Hanan Na'eem Ameen Jarrar, (Born on 14 February 1975 in Jenin) is a Palestinian politician, and diplomat serving as Palestinian Ambassador to South Africa and non-resident Ambassador of the State of Palestine to Namibia, Malawi and Lesotho. On 28 December 2019, she was appointed as Ambassador of the State of Palestine to South Africa by Palestinian President Mahmoud Abbas. On 28 January 2020, she presented his credentials to the President of South Africa, Cyril Ramaphosa.

See also 
 Palestine–South Africa relations

References 

1975 births
Living people
People from Jenin
Birzeit University alumni
Ambassadors of the State of Palestine to South Africa
Palestinian women ambassadors
Ambassadors of the State of Palestine to Namibia